Gorgotoqui is a currently undocumented extinct language of the Chiquitania region of the eastern Bolivian lowlands. It may have been a Bororoan language.

Spellings
Alternate spellings include Borogotoqui, Brotoqui, Corocoqui, Corocotoqui, Corocotoquy, Corogotoqui, Corotoque, Gorgotaci, Gorgotoci, Gorgotoquci, Gorogotoqui, Guorcocoqui, Jorocotoqui, Korchkoki, Orotocoqui.

History
During the period of the Jesuit missions to Chiquitos, Gorgotoqui was the most populous language in the area. It became a lingua franca and the sole language of the Jesuit missions (ICOMOS 1990:59). A Jesuit priest wrote a grammar, but no-one has been able to locate it "in recent years" (Adelaar & Muysken 2004:32), and no other documentation has survived. Thus a language that was regionally important during the colonial era disappeared under pressure from more successful indigenous peoples (Adelaar 2007:326); this appears to have occurred in under half a century (Alarcón 2001:101).

Classification
Loukotka (1968) classified Gorgotoqui as a language isolate, but Kaufman (1990) left it unclassified because of a lack of data. Several languages of the missions "had nothing in common" according to Oliva & Pazos (1895:15).

Bororoan affiliation
Combès (2010) suggests that Gorgotoqui may have been a Bororoan language. Nikulin (2019) suggests the etymology barogo- /barəkə-/ ‘animal’ + -doge /-toke/ ‘plural [+animate]’ for the ethnonym Gorgotoqui.

Combès (2012) also suggests that Penoquí was likely a name given to the Gorgotoqui during the 16th century, and that they were related to the Otuqui (Otuke); indeed, the Gorgotoqui may have been Otuqui who had undergone heavy Chiquitano cultural influence. The Penoqui and Otuqui both lived in the Jesuit Missions of Chiquitos together with the Chiquitano.

Notes

References
 Willem Adelaar and Pieter Muysken (2004) The languages of the Andes. Cambridge University Press
 Willem Adelaar (2007) "The importance of toponomy, family names and historical documentation for the study of disappearing and recently extinct languages in the Andean region", in Wetzels (ed.) Language endangerment and endangered languages: linguistic and anthropological studies with special emphasis on the languages and cultures of the Andean-Amazonian border area. CNWS Publications
 Roberto Balza Alarcón (2001) Tierra, territorio y territorialidad indígena: un estudio antropológico sobre la evolución en las formas de ocupación del espacio del pueblo indígena chiquitano de la ex-reducción jesuita de San José. IWGIA
 Anton Huonder (1899) Deutsche Jesuitenmissionäre des 17. Und 18. Jahrhunderts: Ein Beitrag zur Missionsgeschichte und zur deutschen Biographie. Herder
 ICOMOS (1990) "Jesuit Missions of the Chiquitos", in Advisory Body Evaluation No. 529. UNESCO.
 Terrence Kaufman (1990) "Language history in South America: What we know and how to know more". In D. L. Payne (ed.) Amazonian linguistics: Studies in lowland South American languages (pp. 13–67). Austin: University of Texas Press
 Čestmír Loukotka (1968) Classification of South American Indian Languages. University of California, Los Angeles
 Charles O'Neill & Joaquín María (2001) Diccionario histórico de la compañía de Jesús: Piatti-Zwaans. Universidad Pontificia de Comillas de Madrid
 Anello Oliva & Juan Francisco Pazos (1895) Libro primero del manuscrito original del R.P. Anello Oliva, S.J. Imprenta y libreria de S. Pedro
 Gaspar Ruíz (ca 1620) Gramática de la lengua gorgotoqui del Perú.

Unclassified languages of South America
Languages of Bolivia
Bororoan languages
Mamoré–Guaporé linguistic area